William Alexander Clouston (1843 – 23 October 1896) was a Scottish 19th century folklorist from Orkney.

A Supplement to Alliborne's Dictionary (1891, pp. 349–350), as quoted in Folklore, gives the following biographical information:
b. 1843, at Stromness, Orkney Islands, of an old Norse family, in early life was engaged in commercial pursuits in Glasgow and London, but relinquished these to engage in journalism and literature; he edited several Scotch provincial newspapers, 1871-79, and is a writer for the Glasgow Herald, Evening Times, &c. He has given particular attention to Oriental fiction and folklore, and    contributed to Sir R. F. Burton's "Supplemental Arabian Nights" analogues and variants of some of the tales in vols. I-III.

Bibliography 

Popular Tales and Fictions their Migrations and Transformations, William Blackwood and Sons, Edinburgh and London, 1887

A Group of Eastern Romances and Stories, Privately Printed, 1889.
 Arabian Poetry for English Readers
 Flowers from a Persian Garden and Other Papers
 Book of Wise Sayings: Selected Largely from Eastern Sources
 The Book of Noodles: Stories Of Simpletons; Or, Fools And Their Follies
 The Book of Sindibad, 1884, 300 privately printed copies.
 'Notes on the folk-lore of the Raven and the Owl,' in:

References

External links

 
 

1843 births
1896 deaths
People from Orkney
Scottish folklorists
19th-century Scottish writers
19th-century British journalists
British male journalists
Victorian writers